Così fan tutte is an Italian sketch comedy, based on the French sketch comedy WOMEN!. It stars   Alessia Marcuzzi and Debora Villa in the leading roles.

See also
List of Italian television series

External links
 

Italian television series
2009 Italian television series debuts
2012 Italian television series endings
Italia 1 original programming